Pierre Gélinas (14 August 1818 – 3 April 1911) was a member of the Legislative Assembly of Quebec.

He was defeated as a Conservative candidate in Richelieu electoral district for the House of Commons of Canada in the first Canadian federal election in 1867.  He was elected as a Conservative to the Legislative Assembly of Quebec in an 1869 by-election in Richelieu, but did not run for re-election in 1871.

References
 

1818 births
1911 deaths
Conservative Party of Quebec MNAs